Sixteen special routes of U.S. Route 62 currently exist. Seven of them lie within the state of Arkansas. Three existed in the past but have since been decommissioned.

Oklahoma

Snyder business loop

Business U.S. Highway 62 (Bus. It starts at US 62 west of Snyder, intersects U.S. Route 183 in Snyder, and ends at US 62 east of Snyder.

Major intersections

Henryetta business loop

U.S. Route 62 Business in Henryetta, Oklahoma, in Okmulgee County is another business route of US 62. It begins at I-40 exit 237 west of town. It then continues east through the town to end at US-62/75 east of downtown. The entirety of the route is concurrent with Business Loop I-40 and U.S. 75 Business.

Muskogee business loop

U.S. Route 62 Business in Muskogee, Oklahoma, in Muskogee County is a third business route of US 62 in Oklahoma. The route runs in an overlap with U.S. Route 64 Business along-Okmulgee Avenue and then turns north away from that route along North Main Street.

Tahlequah business loop

U.S. Route 62 Business in Tahlequah, Oklahoma, in Cherokee County, Oklahoma is a fourth business route of US 62 in Oklahoma. The route runs along former sections of the main route along Muskogee Avenue beginning at the western terminus of US 62/OK 82's overlap with OK 51, then runs north into downtown Tahlequah, where it turns right running east along East Downing Street until reaching its terminus at the east end of the US 62/OK 82 overlap.

Arkansas

Prairie Grove business route

U.S. Route 62 Business (US 62B and Hwy. 62B) is a business route of U.S. Route 62 in Prairie Grove, Washington County, Arkansas.

Route description
The route's southern terminus is at US 62 in the southwest part of Prairie Grove. The route runs northeast to meet US 62 on the northeast part of town near Prairie Grove Battlefield State Park.

History
The route was approved by AASHTO following completion of a bypass around Prairie Grove. The parent route designation was shifted to the new terrain alignment, with the former alignment becoming US 62B. In February 2021, city officials requested ArDOT decommission the route as a state highway making it a city street.

Major intersections

Fayetteville business route

Major intersections

Rogers business route

The route connected US 62 to US 71B through Historic Downtown Rogers. It was replaced in 2010 by AR 12.

Route description
US 62B began at US 62 in eastern Rogers and ran due south as 2nd Street. The highway crossed the Arkansas and Missouri Railroad tracks before an intersection with AR 12 (Locust Street). The two highways form a concurrency southbound, together entering Historic Downtown Rogers. US 62B/AR 12 turn onto Walnut Street and continued together westward. US 62B terminates at 8th Street, which carries the US 71B designation south and AR 94 designation northbound. Walnut Street continues west as US 71B/AR 12 toward Bentonville.

Major intersections

Eureka Springs business route

U.S. Route 62 Business (US 62B and Hwy. 62B) is a former business route in Eureka Springs, Arkansas, now known as Historic Loop. It was originally known as U.S. Route 62 City (US 62C).

Berryville spur

U.S. Route 62 Spur (US 62S, Hwy. 62S, and Oak View Drive) is a spur route of U.S. Route 62 in Berryville, Arkansas.

Route description
The route's western terminus is at US 62 in west Berryville. The route runs east as Oak View Drive, passing the industrial park area of the city. State maintenance ends at a fork in the road with A. L. Carter Street to the north and Oak View Drive continuing south.

History
This roadway was added to the state highway system on March 26, 1975 by the Arkansas State Highway Commission to serve the industrial park of Berryville.

Major intersections

Pyatt spur

U.S. Route 62 Spur (US 62S and Hwy. 62S) is a  spur route of U.S. Route 62 in Pyatt, Arkansas.

Route description
The route's southern terminus is at US 62/US 412 at the south edge of Pyatt. The route runs north into downtown Pyatt, connecting the residential area with Highway 62. The route passes the Pyatt School Building and crosses Crooked Creek on the National Register of Historic Places (NRHP) listed Crooked Creek Bridge. State maintenance ends at County Route 321 (CR 321), locally named Bradford Street.

Major intersections

Yellville business route

U.S. Route 62 Business (US 62B, Hwy. 62B, and Old Main Street) is a  business route of U.S. Route 62 in Marion County, Arkansas.

Route description
The route's eastern terminus is at US 62/US 412 in downtown Yellville. The route runs due east as Old Main Street through downtown Yellville, connecting the residential area with Highway 62. The route passes the Yellville Public Library, the Layton Building, and the Marion County Courthouse, with the last two properties being National Register of Historic Places (NRHP) listed. The route turns north onto Berry Street for one block, when it terminates at US 62/US 412/AR 14.

Major intersections

Cotter business route

U.S. Route 62 Business (US 62B and Hwy. 62B) is a  business route of U.S. Route 62 in Baxter County, Arkansas and Marion County, Arkansas.

Route description
The route's eastern terminus is at US 62/US 412 west of Cotter. The route runs east as Ruthven Street on the Cotter Bridge over the White River. Now entering downtown Cotter, the route serves as the southern terminus for Highway 354 and follows Harding Boulevard into downtown Cotter. The route passes the Old Cotter High School Gymnasium listed on the National Register of Historic Places (NRHP). Continuing northeast, the route nears the Cotter Water Tower before terminating at US 62/US 412.

History
The route was formed between 1989 and 1990 when a bypass of Cotter was completed. A new bridge replaced the Cotter Bridge as the primary route over the White River to complete the transition.  On May 23, 2017, AASHTO received and approved recognition of the business route.

Major intersections

Mountain Home business route

U.S. Route 62 Business (US 62B and Hwy. 62B) is a  business route of U.S. Route 62 in Baxter County, Arkansas.

Route description
The route's southern terminus is at US 62/US 412 in the southwest part of Mountain Home. The route runs northeast to meet Highway 178. Further northeast the route forms a concurrency with Highway 5/Highway 201, becoming Main Street, and passing the Mountain Home Commercial Historic District and Baxter County Courthouse. These two properties are both listed on the National Register of Historic Places (NRHP). Approaching a fork in the road, Highway 5/Highway 201 split to the left, and Highway 62B continues to the right. Now heading east the route intersects a second alignment of Highway 178 before terminating at US 62/US 412. On May 23, 2017, AASHTO received and approved recognition of the business route.

Major intersections

Salem business route
U.S. Route 62 Business (US 62B and Hwy. 62B) is a  business route of US 62 in Fulton County, Arkansas.

Route description
The route's western terminus is at US 62/US 412 in west Salem. US 62B runs east along Church Street to the town square, where it turns south along Highway 9. The two concurrent routes continue south along Main Street until meeting US 62/US 412, when US 62B terminates and AR 9 continues south.

Major intersections

Kentucky

Elizabethtown truck route 

U.S. Route 62 Truck (US 62 Truck) is a  truck route around Elizabethtown. For its entire course, it is concurrent with other highways. The route is concurrent with the following routes: 
Interstate 65 from exit 93 to exit 91-B, 
Wendell H. Ford Western Kentucky Parkway from the I-65 junction to exit 135 (for US 31W BYP), and
US 31W Bypass from the WK Parkway interchange to the US 62 junction.

Lawrenceburg truck route

U.S. Route 62 Truck (US 62 Truck) is a  truck route in Lawrenceburg, Anderson County, Kentucky, that follows the U.S. Route 127 Bypass from that route's junction with US 62 to the Kentucky Route 44 junction, then it turns east onto KY 44 into downtown Lawrenceburg.

Ohio

Alliance temporary route

U.S. Route 62 Temporary (US 62T) is a  bypass around the city of Alliance. US 62T, a four-lane highway, begins at US 62 (Atlantic Boulevard NE/State Street) in Stark County. US 62T then has a highway ramp at Beeson Street. Exit ramps provide access from US 62T to Beeson St NE, and then the highway merges onto State Route 225 (SR 225) and ends.

Although the US 62T designation is unsigned, signs on the road read "To West US 62 / To State Route 225 North".

US 62T is planned to extend to Youngstown by 2030.

Pennsylvania

Sharon business loop

U.S. Route 62 Business is a through street in Sharon and Hermitage, Pennsylvania. The route was designated in 1958, after the mainline was moved onto the Shenango Valley Freeway (which is not a true freeway, but instead features at-grade intersections). For its first mile, the route is cosigned with other highways, first Pennsylvania Route 718, then Pennsylvania Route 518. Soon afterward, it expands to four-lanes and contains the hub of commercial development for the region.

New York

Niagara Falls business loop

 
U.S. Route 62 Business follows Pine Avenue through downtown Niagara Falls, New York, spanning  between NY 104 at its western terminus and US 62 at its eastern extent. Although it runs in a mostly east–west direction, it is signed as a north–south route due to US 62 being signed north–south as well within New York.

Pine Avenue was originally designated as part of NY 34 in the 1920s. It then became part of NY 18 after it replaced NY 34 in 1930. In 1932, US 62 was extended into New York and overlapped NY 18 between Dayton and Niagara Falls. NY 18 was truncated to Lewiston, a village north of the city, in the early 1960s, making US 62 the sole occupant of Pine Avenue. US 62 was shifted onto its current alignment through the city later in the decade, allowing Pine Avenue to become New York State Route 62A in the 1970s. NY 62A was redesignated as US 62 Business in 2006.

References

62
 
62
62
62
62
62
62